2-Aminoindane (2-AI) is a research chemical with applications in neurologic disorders and psychotherapy that has also been sold as a designer drug. It acts as a selective substrate for NET and DAT.

Therapeutic and illicit uses
Synthetic aminoindanes were originally developed in the context of anti-Parkinsonian drugs as a metabolite of rasagiline and as a tool to be used in psychotherapy. Deaths related to their toxic effects have been observed both in the laboratory in animal studies and in clinical encounters. 2-AI is a rigid analogue of amphetamine and partially substitutes for it in rat discrimination tests.

Chemical derivatives
There are a number of derivatives of 2-aminoindane and its positional isomer 1-aminoindane exist, including:

Legal status

China
As of October 2015 2-AI is a controlled substance in China.

Sweden 
Sweden's public health agency suggested classifying 2-AI as a hazardous substance, on June 24, 2019.

United States
2-Aminoindane is not scheduled at the federal level in the United States, but may be considered an analog of amphetamine, in which case purchase, sale, or possession could be prosecuted under the Federal Analog Act.

See also 
 2-Aminodilin (2-AD)
 2-Aminotetralin (2-AT)
 Amphetamine
 Bath salts (drug)

References

External links

 
Designer drugs
Norepinephrine reuptake inhibitors
Norepinephrine-dopamine releasing agents
Stimulants